The Boys' doubles tournament of the 2006 BWF World Junior Championships is a badminton world junior individual championships for the Eye Level Cups, held on November 6–11. The defending champion of the last edition were Hoon Thien How and Tan Boon Heong from Malaysia. The host pair Lee Yong-dae and Cho Gun-woo won the gold medal in this event after beat Liu Xiaolong and Li Tian of China in straight games with the score 21–12, 21–16.

Seeded 

Lee Yong-Dae / Cho Gun-Woo (champion)
Mohd Razif Abdul Latif / Vountus Indra Mawan (quarter-final)
Mads Pieler Kolding / Mads Conrad-Petersen (third round)
Lim Khim Wah / Mak Hee Chun (semi-final)
Fernando Kurniawan / Subakti (third round)
Jishnu Sanyal / Akshay Dewalkar (quarter-final)
Henry Tam / Kevin Dennerly-Minturn (second round)
Derek Wong Zi Liang / Jonathan Tang Yew Loong (third round)

Draw

Finals

Top half

Section 1

Section 2

Bottom half

Section 3

Section 4

References

External links 
 Tournament Draw at www.koreabadminton.org

2006 BWF World Junior Championships
2006 in youth sport